Chelanab (also Romanized as Chelanāb, Chelānāb, Chalnab, and Chelnāb; also known as Chanbālyākh, Chelleh Nāb, Chinaliakh, and Chinalyakh) is a village in Ozomdel-e Jonubi Rural District, in the Central District of Varzaqan County, East Azerbaijan Province, Iran. At the 2006 census, its population was 200, in 44 families.

References 

Towns and villages in Varzaqan County